Nexus Indore Central Mall (Earlier Treasure Island Next or TI NEXT) Mall is a recently opened and renovated shopping mall in the city of Indore in India. It was earlier known as Central Mall but underwent renovations and some parts were re-organised in 2017 and was re-branded and re-launched on 26 February 2018.
It is owned by Nexus Malls group and they operate 17 malls across 13 cities of India.

Facilities

Stores
H&M opened its first store in Indore here. The largest Central Departmental Store of Central India is also situated in the mall. Recently Pantaloons has also opened here.

 The mall also boasts the presence of brands such as Reliance Trends, Woodland, Regal Shoes, House of Candy, ONLY, Inc5, Cafe Coffee Day, BIBA, Lenskart, PUMA, SKECHERS, Nykaa and Sugar.

Multiplex
 The mall features an INOX multiplex along with its premium offering Insignia.

Gaming 

 Play In, a Trampoline Park is situated at level five.

See also
The Blackstone Group

References

Shopping malls in Madhya Pradesh
Shopping malls established in 2018
2018 establishments in Madhya Pradesh